Solomon is a New Zealand band, who in 2007 received an award from Festival Smokefreerockquest. Along with this,  they took home the award for best song for Grand Vocation.

Solomon's first success in the competition came the previous year when they came second.

References 

New Zealand rock music groups